Andrea Vavassori (born 5 May 1995) is an Italian tennis player. He has a career high ATP singles ranking of World No. 176 achieved on 8 August 2022. He also has a career high doubles ranking of World No. 51 achieved on 26 September 2022. Vavassori has won two ATP and fourteen ATP Challenger doubles titles.

Career
He qualified at the 2022 Wimbledon Championships making his Grand Slam singles debut. He then got eliminated in the first round by the 23rd seed Frances Tiafoe in straight sets losing 6-4, 6-4, 6-4.

He qualified in singles for the 2023 Córdoba Open. He won his second doubles title with Andrea Pellegrino at the 2023 Chile Open.

ATP career finals

Doubles: 3 (2 titles, 1 runner-up)

Challenger and Futures/World Tennis Tour finals

Singles: 6 (0–6)

Doubles: 52 (26–26)

References

External links
 
 

1995 births
Living people
Italian male tennis players
People from Pinerolo
Sportspeople from the Metropolitan City of Turin
21st-century Italian people